Weskan is an unincorporated community in Wallace County, Kansas, United States. As of the 2020 census, the population of the community and nearby areas was 158. It is the closest community to Mount Sunflower, the highest point in Kanas.

History
The post office in Weskan was established in August 1887.

Weskan has a post office with ZIP code 67762 and there is one high school located within the community.

Demographics

For statistical purposes, the United States Census Bureau has defined Weskan as a census-designated place (CDP).

Education
Weskan is served by USD 242 Weskan Schools. The Weskan mascot is Coyotes. Weskan was the first consolidated school in the state of Kansas.

Weskan High School was one of the first small schools in Kansas to participate in the Kansas 6 man football division in 2014, winning the state title in 2016 and 2018. The 6 man division is not officially sanctioned by the Kansas State High School Activities Association (KSHSAA).

References

Further reading

External links
 USD 242, local school district
 Wallace County maps: Current, Historic, KDOT

Census-designated places in Wallace County, Kansas
Census-designated places in Kansas